Edward A. Noonan ( – ) was the 27th mayor of St. Louis, Missouri, USA, serving from 1889 to 1893.

References

External links
Edward A. Noonan at the St. Louis Public Library: St. Louis Mayors website.

Mayors of St. Louis
1852 births
1927 deaths